The 1979 Avon Championships of Philadelphia  was a women's tennis tournament played on indoor carpet courts at the Palestra in Philadelphia, Pennsylvania in the United States that was part of the 1979 Avon Championships circuit. It was the eighth edition of the tournament and was held from March 5 through March 11, 1979. Fourth-seeded Wendy Turnbull won the singles title and earned $24,000 first-prize money.

Finals

Singles
 Wendy Turnbull defeated  Virginia Wade 5–7, 6–3, 6–2
 It was Turnbull's second title of the year and the fourth of her career.

Doubles
 Françoise Dürr /  Betty Stöve defeated  Renée Richards /  Virginia Wade 6–4, 6–2

Prize money

References

External links
 Women's Tennis Association (WTA) tournament edition details
 International Tennis Federation (ITF) tournament edition details

Avon Championships of Philadelphia
Advanta Championships of Philadelphia
Avon Championships of Philadelphia
Avon Championships of Philadelphia
Avon Championships of Philadelphia